The Gombe Line is the largest mass transit operation owned and commissioned by the government of Gombe State, Nigeria. Its largest station is in downtown Gombe City.

References

Transport in Nigeria